In exponentiation, the base is the number b in an expression of the form bn.

Related terms 
The number n is called the exponent and the expression is known formally as exponentiation of b by n or the exponential of n with base b. It is more commonly expressed as "the nth power of b", "b to the nth power" or "b to the power n". For example, the fourth power of 10 is 10,000 because . The term power strictly refers to the entire expression, but is sometimes used to refer to the exponent.

Radix is the traditional term for base, but usually refers then to one of the common bases: decimal (10), binary (2), hexadecimal (16), or sexagesimal (60). When the concepts of variable and constant came to be distinguished, the process of exponentiation was seen to transcend the algebraic functions.

In his 1748 Introductio in analysin infinitorum, Leonhard Euler referred to "base a = 10" in an example. He referred to a as a "constant number" in an extensive consideration of the function F(z) = az. First z is a positive integer, then negative, then a fraction, or rational number.

Roots
When the nth power of b equals a number a, or a = bn, then b is called an "nth root" of a. For example, 10 is a fourth root of 10,000.

Logarithms
The inverse function to exponentiation with base b (when it is well-defined) is called the logarithm to base b, denoted logb. Thus:

logb a = n.

For example, log10 10,000 = 4.

References

Exponentials
Mathematical terminology